Photuris is a genus of fireflies (beetles of the family Lampyridae). These are the femme fatale lightning bugs of North America. This common name refers to a behavior of the adult females of these predatory beetles; they engage in aggressive mimicry, imitating the light signals of other firefly species' females to attract, kill, and eat the males. Their flashing bioluminescent signals seem to have evolved independently and eventually adapted to those of their prey, mainly unrelated Lampyrinae, such as Photinus (rover fireflies) or Pyractomena.

Species
At least 64 species are currently recognized, all restricted to temperate North America. They mainly occur from the East Coast to Texas. Species include:
 – Barber, 1951
Photuris bethaniensis– McDermott, 1953
 – Barber, 1951
 – Barber, 1951
– LeConte, 1852
– LeConte, 1852
Photuris fairchildi– Barber, 1951
– Fall, 1927
Photuris floridana – Fall, 1927
Photuris frontalis – LeConte, 1852
 – Barber, 1951
Photuris lineaticollis  –  Motschulsky, 1854 
Photuris llyodi  – McDermott, 1966
Photuris lucicrescens – Barber, 1951
Photuris missouriensis – McDermott, 1962
Photuris mysticalampas –  Heckscher, 2013
Photuris pensylvanica – De Geer, 1774
Photuris potomaca – Barber, 1951
Photuris pyralomina – Barber, 1951
Photuris quadrifulgens– Barber, 1951
Photuris salina– Barber, 1951
 – Barber, 1951
Photuris versicolor – Fabricius, 1798
Photuris walldoxeyi–  Faust and Davis, 2019

References

 
Lampyridae genera
Beetles described in 1833
Taxa named by Pierre François Marie Auguste Dejean